The 1996–97 Scottish Inter-District Championship rugby union Scottish Inter-District Championship was the first between the Scottish districts as professional teams.

Caledonia Reds won this first professional tournament. Indeed, it was the northern Scottish district's first and only outright title in their history, since the Scottish Inter-District Championship began in 1953-54. The Reds previously competed as the amateur district North and Midlands.

Glasgow and the Border Reivers also qualified for the Heineken Cup for the next season. In last place, Edinburgh would gain the Amlin Cup place next season.

1996-97 League Table

Results

Round 1

Round 2

Round 3

Matches outwith the Championship

International matches

Cities District: 

Australia: 

Scottish Districts: 

Australia: 

1996–97 in Scottish rugby union
1996–97
Scot